HR 2562 b is a brown dwarf or gas giant exoplanet. It is a substellar companion of the debris disk host star HR 2562. HR 2562 is about 37% more massive than the Sun.

Initially categorised as brown dwarf, HR 2562 b's exact mass is unknown, and is thought to be 29 ± 15 Jupiter masses, and its luminosity is about  solar luminosity. Its spectral type is L7±3. It was first observed in 2016 using the Gemini Planet Imager. 

HR 2562 b resides interior to the parent star's debris disk, and its orbit is coplanar to it. The disk is inclined 78.0° from the plane of the sky to the line of sight, and ranges from 38 ± 20 au to 187 ± 20 au away from the central star.

References

Notes 

Exoplanets discovered in 2016
Exoplanets detected by direct imaging
Brown dwarfs
Pictor (constellation)